The 2021 Townsville 500 (known for commercial reasons as the 2021 NTI Townsville 500) was a motor racing event for Supercars that was held on the weekend of 9–11 July 2021. It was held at the Reid Park Street Circuit in Townsville, Queensland, Australia and featured 2x250km race. The event was the sixth round of the 2021 Supercars Championship.

Report

Background 
The event is the 13th year that Supercars held a round at the event, since it first started in 2009 and the 14th event at the venue, including two rounds during 2020 and was the first time since 2014 that a it utilised a 500 km format.

Shane van Gisbergen came into the round with a 221 points lead over team-mate Jamie Whincup.

Entry List

Results

Race 1

Race 2

References

2021 in Supercars
July 2021 sports events in Australia